Balta Raion was a raion of Odesa Oblast in southwestern Ukraine. Its administrative center was located in the city of Balta which was incorporated separately as the city of oblast significance and did not belong to the raion. The raion was abolished and its territory was merged into Podilsk Raion on 18 July 2020 as part of the administrative reform of Ukraine, which reduced the number of raions of Odesa Oblast to seven.  The last estimate of the raion population was  Its population was 48,604 (including Balta) at the 2001 Ukrainian Census.

Geography
Balta Raion was located in the northern part of the Odesa Oblast.

History
Balta Raion was first established on 7 March 1923 as part of a full-scale administrative reorganization of the Ukrainian Soviet Socialist Republic. Between 1924 and 1940, Balta was part of Moldavian Autonomous Soviet Socialist Republic, and then reverted to Ukraine.

Until 2016, the town of Balta was part of Balta Raion. On 4 February 2016, it was designated the city of oblast significance but remained the administrative center of the raion.

Administrative divisions
Balta Raion was divided in a way that followed the general administrative scheme in Ukraine. Local government was also organized along a similar scheme nationwide. Consequently, raions were subdivided into councils, which were the prime level of administrative division in the country.

Each of the raion's urban localities administered their own councils, often containing a few other villages within its jurisdiction. However, only a handful of rural localities were organized into councils, which also might contain a few villages within its jurisdiction.

Accordingly, until 2016 Balta Raion was divided into: 
 1 city council—made up of the city of Balta (administrative center)
 24 village councils

Overall, the raion had a total of 42 populated localities, consisting of one city, and 41 villages.

References

External links
 
 
 

Former raions of Odesa Oblast
States and territories established in 1923
1923 establishments in Ukraine
Ukrainian raions abolished during the 2020 administrative reform